Unsworth is an English toponymic surname, derived from Unsworth near Bury in the historic county of Lancashire. Notable people with the surname include:

Andrew E. Unsworth, American organist
Barrie Unsworth (born 1934), Australian politician
Barry Unsworth (1930–2012), English writer
Cathi Unsworth, English writer and journalist
David Unsworth (born 1973), English footballer and manager
Dylan Unsworth (born 1992), South African baseball player
Edgar Unsworth (1906–2006), British lawyer and judge
Emma Jane Unsworth (born 1978), British writer
Fran Unsworth (born 1957), British media executive and journalist
Geoffrey Unsworth (1914–1978), British cinematographer
James Unsworth (cricketer) (1844–1893), English cricketer
James Unsworth (entertainer) (1835–1875), English minstrel show comedian
Laura Unsworth (born 1988), English field hockey player
Lee Unsworth (born 1973), English footballer
Phil Unsworth (born 1963), English cricketer
Simon Kurt Unsworth (born 1972), English writer

English toponymic surnames